Jaswantnagar railway station is a small railway station in Etawah district, Uttar Pradesh. Its code is JGR. It serves Jaswantnagar city. The station consists of four platforms. The platforms are not well sheltered. The station lacks many facilities, including water and sanitation.

References

Railway stations in Etawah district
Allahabad railway division